Kaulback is a surname. Notable people with the surname include:

Henry Kaulback (1830–1896), Canadian lawyer, ship owner, and politician
Ronald Kaulback (1909–1995), British explorer, botanist, and geographer

See also
Kaulbach